Conopobathra is a genus of moths in the family Gracillariidae.

Species
Conopobathra carbunculata (Meyrick, 1912) 
Conopobathra geraea Vári, 1961
Conopobathra gravissima  (Meyrick, 1912) 
Conopobathra plethorhabda Vári, 1961

External links
Global Taxonomic Database of Gracillariidae (Lepidoptera)

Gracillariinae
Gracillarioidea genera